Odell Associates in an American architectural practice formed by Arthur G. Odell Jr. in 1940. Originally based in Charlotte, North Carolina, it now has offices in Virginia, Texas and China.

History
Arthur Gould Odell was born November 22, 1913, in Concord, North Carolina, and studied for a year at Duke University in 1930 before transferring to Cornell University, where he graduated in 1935 with a degree in architecture. He continued his studies at the Ecole des Beaux Arts in Paris. Odell became president of American Institute of Architects in 1964-1965). He died April 21, 1988 in Charlotte.

The current CEO is Brad Bartholomew, who joined the board in 2014.

Notable projects

 Bojangles' Coliseum, formally Charlotte Coliseum and Independence Arena, North Carolina 1955
 Hampton Coliseum, Virginia 1970
 Charlotte Douglas International Airport Passenger Terminal, North Carolina 1982
 Charlotte Coliseum 1988 (demolished 2007)
 Knights Stadium, Fort Mill, South Carolina 1990 (demolished 2015)
 Five County Stadium, Zebulon, North Carolina 1991
 Florence Civic Center, 1993
 North Charleston Coliseum, South Carolina 1993
 Columbus Civic Center, Georgia 1996
 Shriners Hospital for Children, Houston 1996
 Cumberland County Crown Coliseum, Fayetteville, North Carolina 1997
 PNC Arena (formally Raleigh Entertainment & Sports Arena), North Carolina 1999
 Philadelphia International Airport Terminal F 2001
 Resch Center, Ashwaubenon, Wisconsin 2002
 William M. Thomas Terminal, Meadows Field Airport, Kern County, California 2006
 BOK Center, Tulsa, Oklahoma 2008 (with Pelli Clarke Pelli and MATRIX Architects)
 BB&T Ballpark, Charlotte, North Carolina 2014
 SRP Park North Augusta, South Carolina 2018

References

External links

Architecture firms based in North Carolina
1940 establishments in North Carolina